This is a list of films which have placed number one at the weekend box office in Belgium and Luxembourg during 2008.

Notes
All the films are North American or British productions, except when stated differently.

References
 Note: Click on the relevant weekend to view specifics.

See also
List of Belgian films - Belgian films by year

2008
Belgium
2008 in Belgium